Rhodocolea is a genus of flowering plants belonging to the family Bignoniaceae.

Its native range is Madagascar.

Species:

Rhodocolea boivinii 
Rhodocolea compressa 
Rhodocolea humbertii 
Rhodocolea humblotiana 
Rhodocolea involucrata 
Rhodocolea lemuriphila 
Rhodocolea linearis 
Rhodocolea magnifica 
Rhodocolea multiflora 
Rhodocolea nobilis 
Rhodocolea parviflora 
Rhodocolea parvifoliolata 
Rhodocolea perrieri 
Rhodocolea racemosa 
Rhodocolea ranirisonii 
Rhodocolea telfairiae

References

Bignoniaceae
Bignoniaceae genera